Karla Moskowitz  is a retired Associate Justice of the New York Appellate Division of the Supreme Court, First Judicial Department.

Early life and education
She is a 1963 graduate of Alfred University and a 1966 graduate of Columbia Law School.

Legal career
Prior to joining the bench, she worked with the State Attorney General’s office, New York City Human Resources Administration, an arbitrator for the Small Claims Division of the Civil Court, an attorney in private practice and as an Administrative Law Judge for the New York State Department of Health. She subsequently served on the New York City Civil Court from 1982 to 1987. She was a New York Supreme Court Justice, from 1987 to 2008 and sat on the Commercial Division from 2001 until her appointment in January 2008. She was designated as a Justice for the Appellate Division, First Judicial Department in 2008 by Governor Eliot Spitzer.

She now serves as an arbitrator and mediator with NAM (National Arbitration and Mediation).

Awards

In 2003, she received the Edith I. Spivack Award from the New York County Lawyers' Association's Women's Rights Committee.

References

Living people
New York (state) lawyers
Columbia Law School alumni
Year of birth missing (living people)